The Saturn Award for Best Animated Series on Television (formerly Saturn Award for Best Animated Series or Film on Television) is one of the annual awards given by the American Academy of Science Fiction, Fantasy & Horror Films. The Saturn Awards are the oldest film and series-specialized awards to reward science fiction, fantasy, and horror achievements.

Included as a category for the first time at the 43rd Saturn Awards ceremony, when the Saturn Awards went through major changes in their television categories, it specifically rewarded animated series or films on television. Beginning with the 45th Saturn Awards, the category had its title changed, focusing solely on animated shows.

Winners and nominees 
The winners are listed in bold.

(NOTE: Year refers to year of eligibility, the actual ceremonies are held the following year)

2010s

2020s

Most nominations
 4 nominations – Family Guy, The Simpsons
 3 nominations – BoJack Horseman
 2 nominations – Archer, Rick and Morty, Star Wars Rebels

Most wins
 2 wins – Star Wars Rebels

References

External links
 Official site

Saturn Awards